Branko Pauljević (Serbian Cyrillic: Бранко Пауљевић; born 12 June 1989) is a Serbian footballer who plays as a right-back for Újpest FC. His main asset is remarkable speed.

Club career
Pauljević spent three years with Hajduk Kula between 2009 and 2012, making 59 appearances and scoring one goal in the top national division. Meanwhile, he had a loan spell with lower tier Senta in 2010.

On 23 May 2012, Pauljević was officially presented as a Partizan player, after signing a four-year contract. In the summer of 2013, he was sent on a season-long loan to Radnički Niš.

Honours
Partizan
 Serbian SuperLiga (1): 2012–13

Individual
 Serbian SuperLiga Team of the Season (1): 2011–12

References

External links
 
 Srbijafudbal profile

1989 births
Living people
Association football defenders
FK Hajduk Kula players
FK Partizan players
FK Radnički Niš players
Pécsi MFC players
Puskás Akadémia FC players
Mezőkövesdi SE footballers
Újpest FC players
Nemzeti Bajnokság I players
FK Senta players
People from Vršac
Serbian footballers
Serbian SuperLiga players
Serbian expatriate footballers
Expatriate footballers in Hungary
Serbian expatriate sportspeople in Hungary